Nunam Iqua, formerly called Sheldon Point, is a city in the Kusilvak Census Area in the U.S. state of Alaska. At the 2010 census the population was 187, up from 164 in 2000.

Nunam Iqua is a Yupik name meaning "land's end" ( = "land";  = "end"). A man named Sheldon opened a fish saltery there in the 1930s, and the city was incorporated under the name Sheldon Point in 1974. The name was changed to Nunam Iqua in a November 1999 referendum.

Geography
Nunam Iqua is located at  (62.516094, -164.895198).

Demographics

Nunam Iqua first appeared on the 1950 U.S. Census as the unincorporated village of "Sheldon's Point." In 1960, it reported as Sheldon Point. In 1974, it formally incorporated as Sheldon Point. In 1999, the name was changed to Nunam Iqua.

As of the census of 2000, there were 164 people, 35 households, and 26 families residing in the city. The population density was 12.4 people per square mile (4.8/km2). There were 45 housing units at an average density of 3.4 per square mile (1.3/km2). The racial makeup of the city was 5.49% White, 0.61% Black or African American, 90.24% Native American, and 3.66% from two or more races.

There were 35 households, out of which 57.1% had children under the age of 18 living with them, 31.4% were married couples living together, 28.6% had a female householder with no husband present, and 22.9% were non-families. 17.1% of all households were made up of individuals, and none had someone living alone who was 65 years of age or older. The average household size was 4.69 and the average family size was 5.22.

In the city the population was spread out, with 51.8% under the age of 18, 8.5% from 18 to 24, 23.8% from 25 to 44, 11.6% from 45 to 64, and 4.3% who were 65 years of age or older. The median age was 17 years. For every 100 females there were 124.7 males. For every 100 females age 18 and over, there were 97.5 males.

The median income for a household in the city was $29,000, and the median income for a family was $26,250. Males had a median income of $48,750 versus $24,375 for females. The per capita income for the city was $6,725. About 40.6% of families and 36.3% of the population were below the poverty line, including 40.9% of those under the age of eighteen and none of those 65 or over.

Education
K-12 students attend Nunam Iqua School, operated by the Lower Yukon School District.

References

External links
 Alaska Division of Community Advocacy - Community Information Summary 
 The lawless 'end of the land'

Cities in Alaska
Cities in Kusilvak Census Area, Alaska
Yukon River